Easy Ride may refer to:

 "Easy Ride", song by The Doors from The Soft Parade
 "Easy Ride", song by Madonna from American Life

See also
 Easy Rider (disambiguation)